Rose de Freitas (born January 23, 1949) is a Brazilian politician and journalist. She has represented Espírito Santo in the Federal Senate from 2015 to 2023. Previously, she was a Deputy from Espírito Santo from 2003 to 2015. She is a member of the Brazilian Democratic Movement (MDB).

References

Living people
1949 births
People from Minas Gerais
Members of the Federal Senate (Brazil)
Brazilian Democratic Movement politicians
Brazilian Social Democracy Party politicians
Podemos (Brazil) politicians